Kolbino is a rural locality (a village) in Kubenskoye Rural Settlement, Vologodsky District, Vologda Oblast, Russia. The population was 12 as of 2002. There are 4 streets.

Geography 
The distance to Vologda is 39 km, to Kubenskoye is 9 km. Pasynkovo, Belavino, Kolbino, Ivanovskoye, Shatalovo are the nearest rural localities.

References 

Rural localities in Vologodsky District